Stenico (Sténech in local dialect) is a comune (municipality) in Trentino in the northern Italian region Trentino-Alto Adige/Südtirol, located about  west of Trento.

Stenico borders the following municipalities: Pinzolo, Ragoli, Giustino, San Lorenzo in Banale, Bocenago, Dorsino, Montagne and Comano Terme.

Demographic evolution

See also
Ponte Arche
Bleggio Inferiore
Lomaso

References

External links
 Homepage of the city

Cities and towns in Trentino-Alto Adige/Südtirol